This uniform polyhedron compound is a symmetric arrangement of 6 cubes, considered as square prisms. It can be constructed by superimposing six identical cubes, and then rotating them in pairs about the three axes that pass through the centres of two opposite cubic faces. Each cube is rotated by an equal (and opposite, within a pair) angle θ.

When θ = 0, all six cubes coincide. When θ is 45 degrees, the cubes coincide in pairs yielding (two superimposed copies of) the compound of three cubes.

Cartesian coordinates 
Cartesian coordinates for the vertices of this compound are all the permutations of

Gallery

References 
.

Polyhedral compounds